Maimouna Traoré (born 1 January 1998) is a Malian international footballer who plays as a forward for the Mali women's national football team. She competed for Mali at the 2018 Africa Women Cup of Nations, playing in two matches.

References

1998 births
Living people
Malian women's footballers
Mali women's international footballers
Women's association football forwards
21st-century Malian people